Northwest Boundary Dike is a historic earthen dike located near Hopkins, Richland County, South Carolina. It was built about 1840 by settlers in the Congaree Swamp to control the periodic flooding of the Congaree River and utilize the fertile swampland. The Northwest Boundary Dike measures approximately 10-to-30-foot-wide-by-5-foot-high, and runs for approximately 2000 feet.

It was added to the National Register of Historic Places in 1996.

References

Buildings and structures on the National Register of Historic Places in South Carolina
Buildings and structures completed in 1840
Buildings and structures in Richland County, South Carolina
National Register of Historic Places in Congaree National Park